Joan Ruth Anderson Growe (born September 28, 1935) is an American politician who served as Secretary of State of Minnesota from 1975 to 1999. Known for her work to encourage voter participation, her tenure was one of the longest of any secretary of state in Minnesota's history. In 1984, she unsuccessfully challenged Republican U.S. Senator Rudy Boschwitz, losing the election with 41% of the vote.

Growe was raised in Buffalo, Minnesota and graduated from Buffalo High School and St. Cloud State University. On August 18, 1956, she married James E. Kerr in Buffalo. That marriage ended in divorce. On June 16, 1965, she married Glen Harry Growe in Anoka County, Minnesota.

Before running for secretary of state, Growe was a member of the Minnesota House of Representatives from 1973 to 1974, representing the old District 40A, which included portions of Hennepin County in the Twin Cities metro area. While in the House, she served on the Crime Prevention and Corrections, the Education, the Judiciary, and the Metropolitan and Urban Affairs committees.

As a state legislator, Growe supported the Minnesota same-day voter registration law (the first in the country) and later, as Secretary of State, she worked to implement it. Since then, Minnesota has consistently had the highest voter turnout in the United States.

Growe is widely recognized as an expert on voting and elections, and has been selected to serve as an official election observer in various foreign elections. She is also on the advisory committee for the Hubert H. Humphrey Institute of Public Affairs at the University of Minnesota.

Records

Files documenting the Growe's activities as secretary of state are available for research use. They include general and chronological correspondence, telephone logs, appearances, subject files, voter education and elections files, and State Board of Investment files.

References

External links

"At home with Joan Growe: Electing to relax" Star-Tribune May 17, 2008
Minnesota Public Radio: Joan Growe – Trailblazing woman in Minnesota politics

|-

1935 births
Living people
Democratic Party members of the Minnesota House of Representatives
People from Buffalo, Minnesota
Politicians from Minneapolis
Secretaries of State of Minnesota
St. Cloud State University alumni
University of Minnesota alumni
Women state legislators in Minnesota
21st-century American women